Lumpy Ridge is a prominent series of rocky cliffs, slabs, and buttresses adjacent to and north of the town of Estes Park, Colorado and lies inside of Rocky Mountain National Park and is known for rock climbing.

The highest point on the ridge are the Needles, at 10,068 feet (3,068.726 m.) on the western edge. Another recognizable feature are the Twin Owls, which, when viewed from Estes Park, look like owls. The slab of stone they rest on is known as the Roosting Ramp.

References

External links
 Lumpy Ridge on RockClimbing.com

Ridges of Colorado
Protected areas of Larimer County, Colorado
Climbing areas of Colorado
Rocky Mountain National Park
Estes Park, Colorado
Landforms of Larimer County, Colorado